Caeculia is a genus of moths in the family Lasiocampidae. The genus was erected by Gottlieb August Wilhelm Herrich-Schäffer in 1854.

External links

Lasiocampidae